Wang Chen (born November 16, 1987 in Shanxi) is a male Chinese volleyball player. He was one of the member of China men's national volleyball team in 2012. On club level he plays for Beijing Baic Motor.

Career
As the substitute of the old opposite spiker, Sun Quan, Wang participated in Chinese Volleyball League from 2009 to 2011. Later, Wang became the main opposite spiker and helped Beijing Baic Motor get three champions including two leagues (Season 12/13 and Season 13/14) and the senior event of 2013 National Games of China. He joined Vero Volley Monza in Season 2014/2015 though he only gets 60 scores in 40 sets.

In 2012, Wang participated in 2012 AVC Cup, as the substitute player of Dai Qingyao.

Before 2016 Summer Olympics, Wang is the accompany trainer of China women's national volleyball team in order to copy Euramerican female opposite spikers.

Awards

Clubs
 2012–2013 Chinese Volleyball League -  Champion, with Beijing
 2013 National Games of China -  Champion, with Beijing
 2013–2014 Chinese Volleyball League -  Champion, with Beijing
 2015–2016 Chinese Volleyball League -  Runner-Up, with Beijing
 2016–2017 Chinese Volleyball League -  Runner-Up, with Beijing
 2017 National Games of China -  Runner-Up, with Beijing
 2017–2018 Chinese Volleyball League -  Runner-Up, with Beijing
 2018–2019 Chinese Volleyball League -  Runner-Up, with Beijing

See also
Profile in 2018–2019 Chinese Volleyball League

References

1987 births
Living people
Volleyball players from Beijing
Chinese men's volleyball players
21st-century Chinese people